Juarez is the debut album by Terry Allen. It was released in 1975. The album was reissued on compact disc by Sugar Hill Records.

Track listing
All tracks composed by Terry Allen
 "The Juarez Device" (aka "Texican Badman")
 "The Characters/ A Simple Story"
 "Cortez Sail"
 "Border Palace"
 "Dogwood"
 "Writing On Rocks Across The USA"
 "The Radio...And Real Life"
 "There Oughta Be a Law Against Sunny Southern California"
 "What of Alicia"
 "Honeymoon in Cortez"
 "Four Corners"
 "The Run South"
 "Jabo/Street Walkin' Woman"
 "Cantina Carlotta"
 "La Despedida (The Parting)"
 "El Camino Instrumental"
 "El Camino"

Personnel
Terry Allen - vocals, piano, maracas
Peter Kaukonen - guitar, mandolin
Greg Douglass - guitar
Diane Harris, Peter Kaukonen - vocals

References

1975 debut albums
Terry Allen (artist) albums
Sugar Hill Records albums